Bumpass is an unincorporated area in Louisa County, Virginia, United States. Its post office is still in service.  National Historical Places  registered in Bumpass include the Duke House and Jerdone Castle. The latter is a plantation (now lakefront) where George Washington spent the night on June 10th during his 1791 Southern tour.

The community was named for John T. Bumpass, one of the first postmasters in the area. The surname "Bumpass" in turn derives from the French bonpass, meaning "good passage".

References

External links
Chronology of the C&Os Piedmont Sub, Bumpass (Site about Bumpass, Virginia)

Unincorporated communities in Louisa County, Virginia